Ali Saleem (Urdu: علی سلیم), best known by his alter-ego Begum Nawazish Ali, is a Pakistani television host, actor, scriptwriter and impressionist. He became a contestant in Bigg Boss 4 in 2010. He broke into the mainstream audiences through his impersonations of late prime minister Benazir Bhutto, and later playing the cross-dressing Begum Nawazish Ali on various television channels, including the Aaj TV network, Dawn News and Geo TV network. His alter ego of Begum Nawazish Ali has now become his primary persona as he rarely appears as the male Ali Saleem. He is a bisexual man born to a retired colonel father in Pakistan Army
and his wife, a former government official.

Biologically born a male, Ali has sometimes called himself gay,
bisexual
or at other times even a transsexual.

Early life and being Ali Benazir
Benazir was born in Islamabad to a colonel in the Pakistan Army.
From a young age, he desired and fantasized about being a woman.
It was in his teens that he got to do a play for Yasmeen Ismail at the Arts Council clad in a burqa offering the audience with his monologue that people saw his inner lady come out. They would flock him and ask him in disbelief of how a child can impersonate a woman older than his age. Ali now says that because his audience was older than his age then, he felt he matured earlier. Ali took his early life education from Cadet College Hasanabdal, Attock and later went to Froebel's International School for A'level

His breakthrough in the entertainment industry came when he started imitating his childhood heroine, the former Prime Minister of Pakistan Benazir Bhutto, from the way she talked to the way she dressed. So loved were his performances that on the occasion of Zohaib Hassan's dholki, Bhutto herself asked Ali to impersonate her. Zohaib's sister Nazia had warned Ali not imitate the prime minister. But, eventually, when asked he even made the prime minister Benazir Bhutto burst out in laughter and appreciated the performance.

Birth of Begum Nawazish Ali
His father and mother would soon seek a divorce, during which Ali had to come to the city of Karachi. There he came to terms with Imran Aslam, a political satire writer who would tell him of a television channel in the pipeline, that would later be called Geo TV. Ali's Benazir impressions were famous among his friends and Imran told him to take it to the airways with the television channel once it got aired. A show dealing with political humour around the time of election in the country aptly named Hum Sub Umeed Se Hai (idiomatically translated as We Are All Expecting (Pregnant), but meant to translate as We Are All Hopeful) showed people impersonating the election candidates. Ali did his Benazir act there for the first time on television.

After a while with the act, Ali came to realise that the act alone would not shape his career and he had to do more with his talent. It was from this very act that Ali gained the nickname BB or bibi meaning lady in Urdu. Omar Adil, an orthopaedic surgeon by profession, doctor to Madam Noor Jehan, was a close friend of his. With an extensive research into Pakistani cinema under his belt and ties to multiple television channels, the doctor suggested Ali with the idea of having a dragged-up character as a host for a talk show. Thus, Begum Nawazish was born.

Late Night with Begum Nawazish Ali
Ali cross-dresses as a woman wearing a sari and asks influential guests provocative questions in his show Late Night with Begum Nawazish Ali. He would invite two guests at a time to be interviewed. The name Begum Nawazish Ali was suggested by Dr. Adil talking of his neighbour with the same name, wife to a colonel. Ali could relate strongly to this persona as an alter ego. The facts that the Begum they created lived a wealthy life living off the money of her late armyman husband and was a socialite, bore resemblance to the life Ali himself had lived in his earlier days. The rights to the show were sold to Aaj TV where the show airs every Saturday night.

Courting controversy
The show has invited the likes of business tycoons, industrialists, actors and actresses, government and religious leaders. Begum would flirt with any one of the male guests "using suggestive banter and sexual innuendo".
It's just this use of gestures and acts that Begum has earned a nasty reputation amongst the more fundamentalist ideals of the religious leaders (where some are even amused by his show)
but has still ventured into the hearts and minds of the younger generations. While talking of taboo topics like "sex" in Pakistan where it is strictly off-limits even trying to mention it, Ali has been spared a backlash only because when on-the-air he is personifying a woman. Women, however, say that they are still afraid to do what Ali is doing on the show.

Where television talk shows in Pakistan are reluctant to take on criticism for the military backed Pakistani government, Begum had always been critical of a general seated as a president. Due to these critical claims, former Pakistani President Pervez Musharraf was opposed to the show's airing. This fair bit of opposition led to the temporary closure of the show. Offers however extended from across the border in India for a follow-up of the show by the name Begum.
The reformatted show aired 26 episodes with Indian celebrities on the channel 9X from India.

The Late, Late Show With Ali Saleem 
Ali Saleem joined DawnNews with his latest show The Late, Late Show with Ali Saleem. Ali Saleem will be hosting the show as himself. The first episode is to be aired on Saturday 26 March 2016. Humayun Saeed, Nadeem Baig and Mehwish Hayat appeared as guests on the first episode.

Property disputes with mother
Reportedly on 26 May 2011 Ali Saleem's mother Farzana Saleem called the capital city police and told them that her son has been torturing her. She was immediately taken to the hospital with a broken nose and other injuries on her body while Ali Saleem was taken to police station. Ali told media personal that there was some dispute going on within the family about property.

Reality television

As Contestant

References

External links 
 Washington Blade John-Manuel Andriote interviews Saleem Ali 
 Washington Post contributor Amar Bakshi interviews Begum Nawazish Ali in Pakistan
 Interview – Ali Saleem
 How Pakistan's 'Dame Edna' has upset Musharraf
DAWN.com

1979 births
Living people
LGBT Muslims
Pakistani male television actors
Pakistani television hosts
Pakistani screenwriters
Pakistani male comedians
Pakistani drag queens
Muslim male comedians
Pakistani socialites
Pakistani LGBT people
People from Islamabad
People from Karachi
Bigg Boss (Hindi TV series) contestants
21st-century LGBT people
Pakistani impressionists (entertainers)